Alice Brown (December 5, 1857 – June 21, 1948) was an American novelist, poet and playwright, best known as a writer of local color stories.  She also contributed a chapter to the collaborative novel, The Whole Family (1908).

Biography
She was born in Hampton Falls, New Hampshire and graduated from Robinson Female Seminary in Exeter in 1876. She later worked as a school teacher for five years, but moved to Boston to write full-time in 1884.  She first worked at the Christian Register and then, starting in 1885, the Youth's Companion.

She was a prolific author for many years, but her popularity waned after the turn of the 20th century. She produced a book a year until she stopped writing in 1935.  She corresponded with Rev. Michael Earls of the College of the Holy Cross and with Father J. M. Lelen of Falmouth, Kentucky, with whom she also exchanged poems. Yale University and Holy Cross now have the only sizable collections of her letters, since she ordered that most of her personal correspondence should be destroyed after her death.  Brown died in Boston, Massachusetts in 1948.

Works
 Fools of Nature (1887) novel
 Sunrise on Mansfield Mountain (1895) (Harper's New Monthly Magazine Oct 1895)
 Meadow-Grass: Tales of New England Life (1896) stories
 The Rose of Hope (1896)
 The Day of His Youth (1897) novel
 Tiverton Tales (1899) stories
 Kings End (1901) novel
 Margaret Warrener (1901) novel
 The Mannerings (1903) novel
 High Noon (1904) stories
 Paradise (1905) novel
 The Country Road (1906) stories
 Rose MacLeod (1908) novel
 The Story of Thyza (1909) novel
 John Winterbourne's Family (1910) novel
 Country Neighbors (1910) stories
 Golden Baby (1910)  In 2009, The Library of America selected this story for inclusion in its two-century retrospective of American Fantastic Tales, edited by Peter Straub.
 The One-Footed Fairy (1911) stories
 The Secret of the Clan (1912)
 My Love and I (1912) novel
 Robin Hood's Barn (1913)
 Vanishing Points (1913) stories
 Joint Owners in Spain (1914)
 Children of Earth (1915) play
 Bromley Neighborhood (1917) novel
 The Prisoner (1916) novel
 The Flying Teuton (1918) stories
 The Black Drop (1919) novel
 Homespun and Gold (1920) stories
 The Wind Between the Worlds (1920) novel
 One-Act Plays (1921)
 Louise Imogen Guiney — a Study (1921) biography
 Old Crow (1922) novel
 Ellen Prior, (1923) verse
 Dear Old Templeton (1927) novel
 The Diary of a Dryad (1932) novel
 The Kingdom in the Sky (1932) novel
 Jeremy Hamlin (1934) novel
 The Willoughbys (1935) novel

[Those titles not classified are individual short stories.]

Another book by Alice Brown is The Patient Sufferer, A Story For Youth.  It was written for the American Sunday-School Union, and revised by the Committee of Publication.  Also noted on title page: 
Philadelphia:  American Sunday-School Union, No. 146 Chestnut Street.  This book also has a sketch on the preceding page with the title "Where Alice Brown lived".

Notes

References

External links

 
 
 
 
 Guide to the Alice Brown Papers, 1876-1947 (University of New Hampshire Library)
 
 Full text of "The Secret of the Clan", Macmillan Company, 1912.
 Alice Brown Papers. Yale Collection of American Literature, Beinecke Rare Book and Manuscript Library.

1857 births
1948 deaths
People from Hampton Falls, New Hampshire
American women novelists
19th-century American novelists
American women dramatists and playwrights
Novelists from New Hampshire
American women poets
20th-century American novelists
20th-century American women writers
19th-century American women writers
20th-century American poets
20th-century American dramatists and playwrights
19th-century American dramatists and playwrights